Żeńsko may refer to the following places in West Pomeranian Voivodeship, Poland:

Nowe Żeńsko
Żeńsko, Choszczno County
Żeńsko, Drawsko County